Florian Harald Prohart (born 12 January 1999) is an Austrian professional footballer who plays as a midfielder for SV Lafnitz.

Club career
He made his Austrian Football Bundesliga debut for Wolfsberger AC on 17 December 2016 in a game against FC Red Bull Salzburg.

References

External links
 

1999 births
Living people
Austrian footballers
Association football midfielders
Austria youth international footballers
Wolfsberger AC players
SV Lafnitz players
Austrian Football Bundesliga players
2. Liga (Austria) players